Moshik Afia (born 3 October 1974 as Moshe Efroni) is a popular Israeli singer who sings in the Mizrahi style. He was born in Holon, Israel to Lebanese Jewish parents.

Selected discography
A rain dripped – 1997 – גשם טפטף
A Story of love – 1998 – סיפור אהבה
In my dreams – 1999 – מתוך חלומותיי
From the sky – 2000 – מן השמיים
 Sweet Dream – 2002 – חלום מתוק
 I've Got You – 2003 – יש לי אותך
 Greatest Hits – 2004 – האוסף
 Get A Woman – 2005 – קח לך אישה
 No Logic In Love – 2007 – אין הגיון באהבה
 Charming look – 2009 – מבט שנוגע
 For Me – 2010 – בשבילי
Close to the Heart – 2011 – קרוב ללב

See also
 Mizrahi music

References

External links
 

1974 births
Living people
20th-century Israeli male musicians
21st-century Israeli male musicians
People from Holon
Big Brother (franchise) winners